Nisar or Nesar is a common Muslim given name which means to sacrifice oneself and literally the word 'Nisar' itself means 'one who sacrifices oneself'.

Nisar may refer to the following:

People
Nesaruddin Ahmad, Bengali Islamic scholar and Pir of Sarsina
Syed Mir Nisar Ali Titumir, Bengali revolutionary
K. S. Nissar Ahmed, Indian poet and writer in Kannada language
Hassan Nisar, Pakistani columnist and an analyst with his own talk show Choraha which he used to do on Geo TV.
Jan Nisar Akhtar, 20th century Indian poet of Urdu ghazals and nazms, also a Bollywood lyricist
Nisar Ali Khan, Pakistani politician, Ministry of Interior
Nisar Ahmed Faruqi, Indian scholar on Sufism
Nisar Ahmad Kakru, former Indian judge from India, Chief Justice of the High Court of Andhra Pradesh
Nisar Ahmad Khuhro, Pakistani politician from Sindh
Nisar Bazmi, composer and music director in the Pakistan film industry
Nisar Khan, Pakistani amateur boxer
Nisar Memon, Pakistani politician, member of the Senate of Pakistan
Nisar Smiler, British Pakistani martial artist, actor, and radio presenter
Qasim Nisar, English kickboxer in the Super Lightweight division
Qazi Nisar Ahmed, Sunni Muslim cleric from Pakistan arrested for sectarian clashes
Mohammad Nissar, cricketer, who played as a fast bowler for the independence Indian cricket team and domestic teams in India and Pakistan

Places
Nesar-e Eskandari, a village in Iran, also referred to as Nisār
Nisar Shaheed Park, a large public park in Karachi, Pakistan

Other uses
 NISAR (satellite), Nasa-Isro Synthetic Aperture Radar (NISAR), a joint space venture between India and USA